Count Adam Tarnowski (2 March 1892 – 9 May 1956), was an Austro-Hungarian and Polish diplomat. He was the minister of foreign affairs in the Polish government in exile from 1944 to 1949.

He was a son of Austro-Hungarian diplomat Adam Tarnowski (1866-1946).

1892 births
1956 deaths
Counts of Poland
Ministers of Foreign Affairs of Poland
Adam